Antananivo Haut is a town and commune in Madagascar. It belongs to the district of Bealanana, which is a part of Sofia Region. The population of the commune was estimated to be approximately 5,000 in 2001 commune census.

References and notes 

Populated places in Sofia Region